Darren Williams (born 13 October 1960) is a former Australian rules footballer who played with Essendon in the VFL during the 1980s.

After winning a Morrish Medal for his performance for Essendon in the under-19s, he made his senior debut in 1979. At the season's end he went to Western Australia where he played with East Fremantle and didn't return to Essendon until 1983. A rover, Williams was a premiership player in 1984 and 1985, also representing Victoria in both seasons.

External links

1960 births
Living people
Essendon Football Club players
Essendon Football Club Premiership players
East Fremantle Football Club players
Australian rules footballers from Victoria (Australia)
Victorian State of Origin players
Two-time VFL/AFL Premiership players